Tony Rice is an album by American guitarist Tony Rice, released in 1977.

Track listing 

 "Banks Of The Ohio" (Traditional)  – 4:10
 "Rattlesnake" (David Grisman) – 4:26
 "Mr. Engineer" (Jimmy Martin, Paul Williams) – 3:03
 "Plastic Banana" (David Nichtern) – 2:52
 "Don't Give Your Heart To A Rambler" (Jimmie Skinner) – 3:47
 "Farewell Blues" (Paul Mares, Leon Roppollo, Elmer Schoebel) – 3:10
 "Way Downtown" (Traditional) – 3:29
 "Stoney Creek" (Jesse McReynolds) – 2:33
 "Hills Of Roane County" (Traditional) – 6:04
 "Eighth of January" (Jimmie Driftwood) – 2:35
 "Big Mon" (Bill Monroe) – 2:52
 "Temperance Reel" (Traditional) – 2:36

Personnel
Tony Rice – guitar, vocals
Darol Anger – violin
Richard Greene – violin
J. D. Crowe – banjo, vocals
David Grisman – mandolin
Larry Rice – mandolin
Jerry Douglas – dobro
Todd Phillips – bass
Production notes
Tony Rice – producer, mixing
Bob Shumaker – engineer, mixing
Susan Marsh – design

References

1977 albums
Tony Rice albums
Rounder Records albums